Anaїs Holly (born  10 December 1992) is a Canadian rugby union player. She plays for Town of Mont-Royal RFC.

Holly made her international debut for Canada in 2016. She competed for Canada at the 2021 Rugby World Cup in New Zealand. She played against the Eagles in their quarterfinal encounter. She also featured in the semifinal against England, and in the third place final against France.

References

External links 
 Anaїs Holly poses for a portrait during the Canada for the 2021 Rugby World Cup headshots , October 01, 2022

1992 births
Canadian rugby union players
Canadian female rugby union players
Canada women's international rugby union players
Living people